Patrick "P. J." Hall Jr. (born April 5, 1995) is an American football defensive end for the Seattle Sea Dragons of the XFL. He played college football at Sam Houston State and was drafted by the Oakland Raiders in the second round of the 2018 NFL Draft. He has also played for the Houston Texans.

College career
Hall was named to the first-team All-Southland during all four years at Sam Houston.  After his junior season Hall was named as the Southland Conference's defensive player of the year, and a finalist for the 2016 Buck Buchanan Award, given to the most outstanding defensive player in the FCS.  Hall was named to the FCS All-American team during his Junior and Senior year. Hall is a member of the Theta Mu chapter of Alpha Phi Alpha fraternity.

Professional career

Oakland Raiders
Hall was drafted by the Oakland Raiders in the second round (57th overall) in the 2018 NFL Draft. He was traded to the Minnesota Vikings on August 3, 2020, but reverted to the Raiders' roster after he failed his physical and was subsequently waived.

Houston Texans
Hall signed with the Houston Texans on August 13, 2020. He was placed on injured reserve on November 25, 2020.

The Texans placed a second-round restricted free agent tender on Hall on March 17, 2021, but they withdrew the tender on April 7, and he became a free agent. On October 22, 2021, Hall was suspended one game for his June 2021 arrest.

Seattle Sea Dragons 
On November 17, 2022, Hall was drafted by the Seattle Sea Dragons of the XFL. He was placed on the reserve list by the team on March 9, 2023.

Legal issues
In June 2021, Hall was arrested on charges of assault and interfering with public duties.

References

External links
Sam Houston State Bearkats bio

1995 births
Living people
People from Seguin, Texas
Players of American football from Texas
American football defensive linemen
Sam Houston Bearkats football players
Oakland Raiders players
Houston Texans players
Seattle Sea Dragons players